Sonnenfeld is a surname.

Notable people with the surname include:

 Barry Sonnenfeld (born 1953), American film maker
 Chloe Sonnenfeld, American actress, daughter of Barry Sonnenfeld
 David A Sonnenfeld (born 1953), professor at the State University of New York College of Environmental Science and Forestry
 Jeffrey Sonnenfeld (born 1954), professor at Yale University
 Kurt Sonnenfeld (born 1962), American videographer for FEMA, notable for his 9/11 work
 Portia Sonnenfeld, founder and music director, Princeton Symphony Orchestra
 Sigismond Sonnenfeld (1846-1929), Director-General of the Jewish Colonization Association
 Stefan Sonnenfeld (born 1964), American colorist
 Viktor Sonnenfeld (1902-1969), Croatian translator and philosopher
 Yosef Chaim Sonnenfeld (1849-1932), former chief rabbi of Jerusalem

German toponymic surnames